For the fictional character from the Al-Qadim campaign setting of Dungeons & Dragons, see Selan (Dungeons & Dragons). For the village in Albania, see Selan, Albania.

Selan (born Selan Lerner in Queens, New York, United States) is an American musician, singer, songwriter, composer, arranger, musical director and record producer, who is known for combining electronic, pop, and soul music. He possesses perfect pitch and musical total recall, also known as eidetic memory. He is of Trinidadian and Jewish heritage.

Career
Selan has collaborated extensively with "Little" Louie Vega and Kenny "Dope" Gonzales of the house music production team Masters at Work. Notably he plays the extended keyboard improvisation on the Masters at Work remix of Nina Simone's "See-Line Woman" which appears on the successful 2002 Verve Remixed collection. He also plays the extended keyboard solos on the DJ Spinna remix of Betty Carter's "Naima's Love Song", which appears on the 2003 follow-up Verve Remixed 2 collection. Selan co-wrote the music for most of DJ Spinna's Intergalactic Soul album, which was released in 2006 on Shanachie Records. He also co-produced, co-wrote and was a featured artist on "Back 2 U", a standout track on that same album.

His 2004 single "Unconditional Love," produced by DJ Spinna, was released on the Wonderwax record label. Selan's solo single "Gravity" was released in 2005 on Louie Vega's Vega Records. He is the co-writer of the song "Focus" which appears on Concrete Rose, the 2004 album by American R&B singer Ashanti. He also appears as a co-writer on the songs "Marathon" and "Desire" which appear on the 2007 Grammy Award-nominated second album Love Behind the Melody by Raheem DeVaughn.

As a side musician, he has performed with Adele, Bono, Alejandro Sanz, Toni Braxton, Rihanna, Miley Cyrus, R&B singer Joe, Stevie Wonder and Roy Ayers. He has recorded with and/or for Kanye West, Aaliyah, David Byrne, Earth, Wind and Fire, R. Kelly, Musiq Soulchild and many others. Selan's keyboard work on the house remix for Curtis Mayfield's "Superfly" helped DJ/producer Louie Vega win the 2006 Grammy Award for 'Best Remix'. He has been a member of Little Louie Vega's Elements of Life Band, and also plays keyboards and sings background for Chic featuring Nile Rodgers.

After being traveling as part of Adele's band from January to July 2009, Selan joined Chic. He played keyboards and sang background vocals.

In September 2011, Selan joined the house band as a keyboardist, vocalist and trumpet player for Rosie O'Donnell's The Rosie Show, which aired on Oprah Winfrey's OWN network. It was cancelled in March 2012.

On August 8, 2012, Selan released his debut album, Space Flight, which features contributions from Nile Rodgers, Ali Shaheed Muhammad, M1, Emily King and Melissa Jimenez.

Selan decided to leave Chic in January 2014 and subsequently retire from being a side musician. He decided to focus all of his efforts on music production, his solo career, filmmaking and other business ventures. Selan is currently developing TV shows, short films and documentaries. He is also in the midst of creating innovative vegan clothing, footwear and accessories. Selan is vegan, an environmental, human and animal rights activist and a feminist.

Beginning in September 2015, Selan has been a frequent guest musician in the house band for The Late Show with Stephen Colbert.

Selan released his album, The Future on Pi Day, March 14, 2016.

Solo discography
"Unconditional Love" (single) (2004)
"Gravity" (single) (2005)
"Alwayz Sumthin" (DJ Spinna remix featuring Phonte and Sage) (single) (2007)
Space Flight album (2012)
The Future album (2016)

References

External links
 Official website

Year of birth missing (living people)
Living people
American Jews
American electronic musicians
American soul singers
Record producers from New York (state)
21st-century African-American male singers